Hills et al. v. Ross, 3 U.S. (3 Dall.) 184 (1796), is an early United States Supreme Court case determining that the Supreme Court held:
A plea in the admiralty by one partner, in behalf of himself and his copartners, the rejoinder being signed by a proctor for all the defendants, amounts to a legal appearance of all the defendants.

Prize agents, who receive the proceeds of sales of prizes, and pay them over to the proctors without an order of the court, are responsible to the owners of the captured property for the net amounts so received by them, in case restitution is decreed.

See also
 List of United States Supreme Court cases, volume 3
 Hills et al. v. Ross II

References

External links
 

United States Supreme Court cases
United States Supreme Court cases of the Ellsworth Court
1796 in United States case law